"Afër dhe Larg" is a song recorded by Albanian singer and songwriter Elvana Gjata released as the lead single from her second studio album, Afër dhe Larg (2011). The song was entirely written and composed by Albanian musician Flori Mumajesi.

The song is an Albanian language house-pop song and speaks about the feeling of "having and not having anyone near, of an emotion that begins and ends where it begins". It was one of Elvana's most successful songs and was voted best Albanian song at the 2012 Balkan Music Awards.

Background

Composition 

"Afër dhe Larg" performed by Elvana Gjata was written and composed by Albanian musician Flori Mumajesi with whom she has extensively worked on the eponymous studio album. The song was composed in  time and is performed in the key of E minor in common time with a tempo of 128 beats per minute. The video was shot in Greece and won "Video of the Year" at the Balkan Music Awards.

Promotion 

The accompanying music video for the song was officially premiered onto the YouTube channel of Elvana Gjata in July 2011 and was re-uploaded on 20 November 2014.

Release history

References 

2011 singles
2011 songs
Elvana Gjata songs
Albanian-language songs
Song recordings produced by Flori Mumajesi
Songs written by Flori Mumajesi